The Miquon School is an independent, parent-owned, elementary school located in Whitemarsh on the suburban outskirts of Philadelphia, Pennsylvania.

History
The Miquon School was founded in 1932 by a group of parents following the progressive philosophy of John Dewey. The Upper School was founded in 1970 and later became The Crefeld School.

Philosophy
Central to the school's philosophy is that children learn best through inquiry and discovery. Children often work independently or in small teams. Miquon School attempts to cultivate joy in learning, by emphasizing the child's ownership and personal involvement in their learning. Typical examples: third-graders have an authors' party in which they share their original writing with parents and other students; a math lesson on scale can lead to constructing a model of the solar system that spans the length of the campus. In accordance with its philosophy, Miquon provides ample "choice time" for children to pursue their own interests. Specialist classrooms (music, science, PE, library, and art) are often open at such times so that children can drop in. After graduation, students go to a wide range of middle and upper schools in Philadelphia and the suburbs, including neighborhood schools and academically-selective public programs.

Beginning with a nursery group for 3- and 4-year-olds and culminating at the end of sixth grade, the school believes that treasuring and preserving childhood is one of its core goals. The outdoor play spaces are filled with children of all ages, much like an idealized neighborhood. Inclusion, mutual respect, and peaceful negotiation are necessary for this to succeed, and teachers work with children from the nursery group onward to instill such skills and attitudes. Partnerships between older and younger classrooms help to build a society in which every child is known and can feel secure. A monthly "good-of-the-school" town meeting involves every child from kindergarten and up. Led by sixth graders, the meeting gives children a chance to present problems and work together to find solutions, as well as share classroom news and make announcements.

The teaching staff consists of classroom teachers, specialists, and providers of learning support. Every home classroom is staffed by a group teacher and an assistant. Some teachers are relatively new to the school, while others have taught at Miquon for 35 years or more. The teaching staff and the administrative staff work together closely to create a vibrant and inclusive community. The students are a culturally and ethnically diverse group and come from both traditional and non-traditional families. Parents are essential partners in their children's education. Classrooms are always open to them as visitors and helpers, and teachers sustain frequent communication with them.

See also
The Crefeld School

References

External links

Private elementary schools in Pennsylvania
Educational institutions established in 1932
Schools in Montgomery County, Pennsylvania
1932 establishments in Pennsylvania